Morgan Jones (born 29 January 1968 in Sydney) is a British former alpine skier who competed in the 1988 Winter Olympics.

References

External links
 

1968 births
Living people
Skiers from Sydney
British male alpine skiers
Olympic alpine skiers of Great Britain
Alpine skiers at the 1988 Winter Olympics